Widows' Peak is a 1994 British-Irish mystery film directed by John Irvin and starring Mia Farrow, Joan Plowright, Natasha Richardson, Adrian Dunbar and Jim Broadbent. The film is based on an original screenplay by Hugh Leonard and Tim Hayes.

Story 
In the 1920s, just after the First World War, in an Irish village named Kilshannon, Edwina Broome has moved into the neighbourhood known as "Widows' Peak", named for the prevalent marital status of the residents, who are a rather exclusive group. The residents are curious about their new neighbour, Edwina, but information is not available about her, even for the leader of the place, Mrs. Doyle Counihan, whose son is busy attempting to attract Edwina. Miss O'Hare and Edwina immediately dislike each other, however, and soon some accidental encounters begin to look like Edwina is trying to ruin her new rival. The problems escalate and the town is in an uproar, but they get no closer to solving the mystery of the newcomer.

Production notes 

The film was mainly shot on location in the counties of Wicklow, Dublin and Kilkenny. The house used during production was that of Stonehurst, Killiney Hill Road, Co. Dublin. The concept for the film came from its co-producer Prudence Farrow. While it had been intended for her mother Maureen O'Sullivan to play the role of Miss O'Hare, the part went to O'Sullivan's daughter and Prudence's sister Mia Farrow. O'Sullivan declined the part due to her advanced age and dwindling stamina.

Set in the 1920s, the film's period wardrobe needs were handled by Angels and Bermans as well as Costumi d'Arte and European Costume Company. Consolata Boyle was the costume designer.

The film grossed $6.2 million in U.S. theatrical release.

Reception 
The film was well received by critics and the public. Roger Ebert of the Chicago Sun-Times said, the film "uses understated humor and fluent, witty speech; it's a delight to listen to, as it gradually reveals how eccentric these apparently respectable people really are."

Awards 
In 1995, the actress Natasha Richardson received the Crystal Globe award at the Karlovy Vary International Film Festival, Czech Republic, for her role in this film. The director, John Irvin, was also nominated for this award. It received the best picture award at the 1995 Austin Film Festival.

Year-end lists 
 8th – Peter Rainer, Los Angeles Times
 8th – Sean P. Means, The Salt Lake Tribune
 9th – Douglas Armstrong, The Milwaukee Journal
 Top 10 (listed alphabetically, not ranked) – Jimmy Fowler, Dallas Observer
 Top 10 Runner-ups – Bob Ross, The Tampa Tribune
 Best "sleepers" (not ranked) – Dennis King, Tulsa World
 Honorable mention –  Glenn Lovell, San Jose Mercury News
 Honorable mention – Todd Anthony, Miami New Times
 Honorable mention – Duane Dudek, Milwaukee Sentinel
 Honorable mention – Bob Carlton, The Birmingham News

References in popular culture 

 The character Doug from the TV series of the same name referenced the film in a daydream where he was a bodybuilder.
 The character Blossom Russo from the show Blossom goes to see Widow's Peak with her stepmother Carol in the episode "Writing the Wrongs".

Notes

External links 

1994 films
1994 comedy films
1990s comedy mystery films
British comedy mystery films
1990s English-language films
Films directed by John Irvin
Films scored by Carl Davis
Films set in Ireland
Films set in the 1920s
Films shot in County Dublin
Films shot in County Kilkenny
Films shot in County Wicklow
Films with screenplays by Hugh Leonard
Irish comedy mystery films
1990s British films